NOL may refer to:

 Narrow outside lane
 Naval Ordnance Laboratory
 Neptune Orient Lines
 Net operating loss
 New Orleans Union Passenger Terminal, Louisiana, United States; Amtrak station code NOL

See also
 Nol (disambiguation)